Broadnax is a surname. Notable people with the surname include:

Donald Broadnax (born 1961), American serial killer on Alabama's death row
Horace Broadnax, the head men's basketball coach at Savannah State University
Morris Broadnax (1931–2009), Motown songwriter
Robert Broadnax Glenn (1854–1920), the Democratic governor of the U.S. state of North Carolina from 1905 to 1909
Rodriquez Broadnax (born 1994), better known by her stage name Jacquees, American singer and songwriter
Walter Broadnax (1944-2022), American educator
Willmer "Little Ax" Broadnax, (1916–1994), African-American hard gospel quartet singer